"Happy Talk" is a show tune from the 1949 Rodgers and Hammerstein musical South Pacific. It is sung by Bloody Mary to the American lieutenant Joe Cable, about having a happy life, after he begins romancing her daughter Liat. Liat performs the song with hand gestures as Mary sings.

Ella Fitzgerald recorded this song with Gordon Jenkins and his orchestra for Decca and it was included on her 1955 album Miss Ella Fitzgerald & Mr Gordon Jenkins Invite You to Listen and Relax.

Captain Sensible version

In July 1982, The Damned's guitarist Captain Sensible reached the No. 1 position on the UK Singles Chart for two weeks with his version of the song, featuring backing vocals by the band Dolly Mixture. This version also peaked at number 35 in Australia.

Other cover versions
 Ella Fitzgerald recorded a version with Gordon Jenkins and His Orchestra on the Decca 78 rpm single "I'm Gonna Wash That Man Right Outa My Hair" / "Happy Talk". It later appeared on the 1955 Decca compilation album, Miss Ella Fitzgerald & Mr Gordon Jenkins Invite You to Listen and Relax.
 Muriel Smith recorded "Happy Talk" in November 1951 on the UK Columbia record label, DB2957.
 Doris Day recorded "Happy Talk" in December 1960 for her album Bright and Shiny.
 Nancy Wilson sang "Happy Talk" on her 1961 collaboration with Cannonball Adderley, Nancy Wilson/Cannonball Adderley.
 Claudine Longet recorded a version for her album Love is Blue (1968).
 In 1967, Harpers Bizarre did a cover of the song, including it in their album Feelin' Groovy, which was released in the same year.
 Daniel Johnston covered the song at least two times, first on his solo 1983 cassette "The Lost Recordings II", and later with Jad Fair on their album It's Spooky, released in 1989.
 The Four Freshmen covered the song on the album Voices in Fun (1961).
 Karrin Allyson covered the song on the 2015 album Many a New Day: Karrin Allyson Sings Rodgers & Hammerstein with Kenny Barron and John Patitucci.

Samples
 In 2004, UK grime MC Dizzee Rascal sampled Captain Sensible's version on the single "Dream", which reached No. 14 on the UK Singles Chart.

Film
 A brief clip of the song, played on an organ, can be heard in The Wrong Trousers, in a sequence where Gromit is unable to sleep because of loud music.
 The Don Shirley Trio plays the song during a concert scene in  Green Book (2018).
 The 2014 movie Welcome to Me opens with this song.

See also
 You've Got to Have a Dream (2004 book)

References

External links
 Official Charts Company

1949 songs
Songs from South Pacific (musical)
1982 singles
UK Singles Chart number-one singles
Songs with music by Richard Rodgers
Songs with lyrics by Oscar Hammerstein II
Nancy Wilson (jazz singer) songs
Songs from South Pacific (1958 film)
Captain Sensible songs
A&M Records singles